Pecho Creek originally known as Arroyo Del Pecho or Cañada del Pecho is a stream in San Luis Obispo County, California.

Its mouth is at sea level in the Pacific Ocean.

History
Pecho Creek was part of the eastern boundary of the Rancho Pecho y Islay, and of subsequent Rancho Cañada de los Osos y Pecho y Islay when it was consolidated with the Rancho Cañada de los Osos in 1845. It was part of the western border of the Rancho San Miguelito.

References 

Rivers of San Luis Obispo County, California